Elijah is a fictional character from the television series The Walking Dead, where he is portrayed by Okea Eme-Akwari.

Television series

Season 10
In the second part finale "A Certain Doom", Gabriel is nearly killed, but he is saved by a hooded, masked warrior in the company of Maggie Greene, who has returned after reading a letter from Carol informing her about the Whisperers. The pair were also able to save Aaron and Alden from a group of Whisperers that had surrounded them earlier.

In the third part premiere "Home Sweet Home", Maggie, Daryl, Kelly, and two of Maggie's people, Cole and Elijah, head off to find the rest of Maggie's group, the Wardens, at a rendezvous point. With nightfall approaching, the group find shelter in a shipping container. The following morning, Kelly is discovered to have abandoned her post while on watch; the group find her in the woods searching for Connie. Later, upon arriving at the rendezvous point, they find that the camp has been burned down and is empty. Cole suspects that this was done by the Reapers, a hostile group that destroyed their former home; the group begin searching for any survivors, including Hershel. Soon after, Maggie reunites with three members of her group, but all three are swiftly killed by a lone Reaper using a silenced weapon. Kelly manages to wound the Reaper using Daryl's crossbow; the group surround the attacker. Maggie then furiously questions the man about his identity and his group, but he only taunts Maggie by simply saying "Pope marked you", before committing suicide by detonating a grenade as the others dive for cover. With nowhere else to go, the group travel to Alexandria, only to find it under repair since it was trashed by a horde of walkers, led by Beta, after the residents evacuated and took shelter in a nearby hospital.

Season 11
In the season premiere "Acheron: Part I", Elijah is part of a group who raid the abandoned Fort Connors military base for food supplies. Elijah and the Wardens accompany Maggie and a group of Alexandrians to Meridian to eliminate the Reapers and secure food and water for Alexandria. In the episode "Acheron: Part II", Elijah and the rest of the survivors go through the subway tunnels and fight their way through the walkers, and then travel down a road when the Reapers launched an ambush on the survivors. In the episode "Hunted", Elijah defends himself and rushes in to free Maggie but is captured himself. In the episode "Out of the Ashes", at the satellite outpost, Maggie and Negan arrive to find that nobody else regrouped there. Later, as Negan prepares to give up and go home, Maggie aggressively stops him, before Gabriel arrives with Elijah. In the episode "On the Inside", when Leah's search party arrives at the yellow house, Daryl covertly signals Maggie, Negan, Gabriel, and Elijah, who hide in a compartment in the floor to avoid the Reapers. Carver finds the hidden door but upon lifting up the carpet, it is empty. In the episode "Promises Broken", Maggie, Negan, Gabriel, and Elijah, on the run from Reapers, try to think of a way to get inside Meridian. Negan insists that they should go home, but Maggie pressures the group to move forward. Negan promises to stay on the condition that he and Maggie would be even from then on, and Maggie reluctantly agrees. Maggie suggests gathering a horde of walkers to attack Meridian with, and Negan teaches the group how to blend in with the walkers and guide herds with face masks, which he learned from the Whisperers. During this time, Elijah is reunited with his reanimated sister who was murdered by the Reapers, but he is unable to put her down without blowing the group's cover with the herd. In the first part finale "For Blood", Negan and Elijah lead the herd back to Meridian's walls, which trigger landmines and explosives around the perimeter, injuring Elijah's leg. However, shortly after the group gets inside of the walls, the Reapers use a hwacha to blow up the entire herd, placing them in danger.

In the second part premiere "No Other Way," an injured Elijah joins Maggie, Daryl, Gabriel and Negan in confronting the Reapers in a cat-and-mouse game throughout Meridian, killing most of them. Elijah finally comes face-to-face with Brandon Carver, the sadistic Reaper who had murdered his sister Josephine. Carver is eventually subdued by Negan after a fight, but Daryl stops the others from killing him in the hopes of trading Carver for a peaceful solution. Seeking revenge, Elijah attempts to kill Carver anyways, but collapses from his injuries. As the surviving Reapers retreat, Elijah reminds Maggie of her promise to avenge his sister and everyone else who had died in Meridian and she guns down the retreating Reapers before using one of Elijah's kamas to kill Carver, giving Elijah his revenge for Josephine's murder. A recovered Elijah later moves to the Hilltop with Maggie where he aids in the rebuilding efforts and acts as a perimeter guard. Elijah befriends Marco, a young man of similar age to him, and develops feelings for Lydia. Elijah later accompanies Maggie and Lydia to Riverbend where he plays a crucial role in the defeat of Toby Carlson and his forces, sneaking up on them while they are distracted by Aaron and Gabriel. Elijah later joins Maggie and Marco in fighting off Lance Hornsby's attacking forces, although Marco is killed and Maggie is abducted by Leah Shaw, the last of the Reapers, before Daryl rescues her and kills Leah.

In the third part, Elijah joins a supply mission to Oceanside in the wake of Lance's defeat alongside Aaron, Lydia and Jerry. Elijah and Lydia's feelings for each other grow deeper and deeper, although Lydia hesitates to act upon them out of the fear of losing someone else that she loves horribly. With Aaron's encouragement, Lydia finally kisses Elijah, and they start dating each other. However, their mission is interrupted by the discovery that Oceanside has been taken over by the Commonwealth and Luke and Jules joining the group. On the run from the Commonwealth Army, the group covers themselves in walker guts in order to hide in a nearby herd which is redirected by Commonwealth soldiers towards the Commonwealth itself. While trying to escape into an RV, Luke and Jules are swept away from the others and Elijah is separated from Lydia who is bitten in the arm trying to reach him. Although Luke and Jules and later Aaron and Lydia manage to make it to the Commonwealth with the herd, neither Elijah nor Jerry who went to find the others do, causing concern that they've perished. Finally, Elijah and Jerry rejoin the others at the Estates as the desperate Commonwealth citizens are let in while the herd approaches. Elijah assists in the efforts to lure the herd into the Estates and destroy it completely. A year later, Elijah is still together with Lydia, and they work as couriers between the communities.

Development and reception
Okea Eme-Akwari was cast as Elijah, a mysterious and masked member of the Wardens. He first appears in the tenth season second part finale "A Certain Doom" as a mysterious masked figure saving Alden and Aaron from a group of Whisperers. Jeffrey Lyles, who writes for Lyles Movie Files, liked how Gabriel's "sacrifice play gets spared as Maggie and her hockey mask blade-wielding pal save him. If this were a comic book, this would be a previously thought dead character operating under a new identity. Either way, this guy looks cool and I want to know more." Writing for IGN, Matt Fowler liked how Maggie's return "came with a really cool Snake Eyes-style ninja warrior carrying giant boline blades". Writing for The A.V. Club, Alex McLevy wrote that "Maggie’s back, and she brought with her that weird silent masked guy wielding kama blades. (The pair of them appearing out of nowhere to save Gabriel in the hospital didn't make a lick of sense, but it was a fun twist, and gave Aaron the opportunity to throw some suspicious side-eye in the masked fighter's direction.)" Richard Rys, who writes for Vulture, also praised Maggie's return: "But infinitely more fascinating is the real hero, her pal Hoodie Ninja, the hockey-masked dude who was seen double-fisting blades and throwing mad Bruce Lee vibes at Aaron in the opening scenes of the episode. While Mags and Gabe embrace, Aaron gives Hoodie Ninja a look that suggests he's rather freaked out."

Robert Balkovich reviewed the tenth season third part premiere "Home Sweet Home" and wrote that "he's a young man who does indeed look incredibly anxious about the danger they've found themselves in. For Elijah, the scary mask he wears is quite literally a cover to shield himself from the outside world. With it on, people are intimidated by him, but only because they can't see that underneath, he's the one who's terrified. Kelly gives him a quick pep talk, and later, Elijah shares some food with her to cement their budding friendship." Jonathon Wilson for Ready Steady Cut commented that "More interesting than what Maggie left behind is what she brings with her, in the form of both allies and enemies. Her compatriot Elijah, who wears a fearsome mask, is of particular interest and is a good excuse for Kelly to become slightly distracted from her fervent though thus far unsuccessful search for her sister, Connie [...] Elijah wears the mask because he's also dealing with the loss of a sister and is, frankly, terrified of all the zombie shenanigans. It's easier to wear something that strikes fear in others, rather than reveal his own, which is a cool angle." IGN critic Matt Fowler commented on the new additions to the show and said that "None of them look as cool though as Maggie's cohort, Elijah (Okea Eme-Akwari), who seems to operate like The Walking Dead's Snake Eyes at this point, downing foes with Japanese kama blades." Alex McLevy of The A.V. Club wrote that "I sort of admire the decision to take the mask-wearing question mark, Elijah (Okea Eme-Akwari), and immediately reveal him to be nothing but a scared young man, hiding his trauma and fears behind his mysterious costume. And there's some potential to explore what sent the guy down this path [...] But it came across as uneven and jarring—suddenly the character we've seen do nothing but kick ass without batting a (metaphorical) eye gets too scared to move and needs a pep talk from Kelly? [...] It's not that it doesn't necessarily track for the character; it's that we don't know him at all, let alone well enough for it to play as meaningful in any real way."

References

The Walking Dead (franchise) characters